Bahía de Portete (Bahia Portete) is a bay in La Guajira, Colombia. The bay opens to the Caribbean Sea.

The Puerto Bolivar Airport is the closest airport to the bay.

References

Bays of Colombia
Geography of La Guajira Department